Haryana Dairy Development Cooperative Federation Ltd has been formed in 1970 as a state government cooperative for facilitating procurement, processing, and marketing of milk and dairy products under brand name "Vita" in state of Haryana. It is under the ownership of Ministry of Cooperation, Government of Haryana. It procures milk from its producers particularly belonging to economically weaker sections in state of Haryana and subsequently processes into milk and various milk products for marketing through affiliated milk unions. It provides education to the unions on dairy processing efficiency, and helps them with guidance on animal care including artificial insemination, vaccination, and feeding.

History and Administration

The Haryana Dairy Development Cooperative Federation Ltd was started in 1970 to facilitate milk procurement from various producers in the state and promoting the socio-economic development and facilitating its processing into various products before marketing through different unions across Haryana branded "Vita". Dairy Cooperatives in state work in three tier system wherein :- i) Milk Producers Cooperative Societies operate at village level ii) Milk Unions operate at District level iii) State Dairy Federation at state level. The society in May 2020 planned to open a new plant in South Haryana and submitted the plan to State Government.

In Year 2016, Haryana Dairy Development Cooperative Federation Ltd, had started VITA milk booths at Indian Oil Corporation Ltd (IOCL) operated petrol pumps in several places of the state.

In Year 2020, the Haryana Dairy Development Cooperative Federation Ltd procured extra milk from producers which have been left over due to the closure on various outlets in State due to COVID pandemic.

Haryana Dairy Development Cooperative Federation Ltd had started online delivery of its products in select areas of the state from year 2020,and for this had tied up with Swiggy, food ordering and delivery platform.

Amneet P Kumar, is the current Managing Director (MD) of Haryana Dairy Development Cooperative Federation Ltd.

Milk Yield and Production

Haryana Dairy Development Cooperative Federation Ltd procures milk from one of the highest yielding buffalo breed called "Murrah buffaloes".

Occasionally, Haryana Government enhances the purchase rate of the milk based on the fat content in the milk in addition to subsidy per litre of milk given to the producers.

From year 2016, Haryana Dairy Development Cooperative Federation Ltd was supported by Haryana Government in promoting cow milk.

From October 2020, Haryana Dairy Development Cooperative Federation Ltd had introduced turmeric milk and from January 2021,Cow Ghee.

Milk Plants
 Jind Milk Plant.
 Ambala Milk Plant.
 Rohtak Milk Plant.
 Ballabgarh Milk Plant.
 Sirsa Milk Plant.
 Kurukshetra Milk Plant.

See also
Karnataka Milk Federation
Odisha State Cooperative Milk Producers' Federation
Bihar State Milk Co-operative Federation

References

External links 
 Official Website

Dairy products companies of India
Economy of Haryana